Andressa Moreira Fidelis (born 20 January 1994) is a Brazilian female sprinter. She represented Brazil at the 2010 Summer Youth Olympics and went on to represent Brazil at senior level competitions including the 2019 South American Championships and in 2019 Pan American Games.

She was part of the Brazilian contingent at the 2019 Pan American Games and claimed gold medal in the women's 4×100m event.

References

External links 

1994 births
Living people
Brazilian female sprinters
Pan American Games gold medalists for Brazil
Pan American Games medalists in athletics (track and field)
Athletes (track and field) at the 2019 Pan American Games
Pan American Games athletes for Brazil
Athletes (track and field) at the 2010 Summer Youth Olympics
Medalists at the 2019 Pan American Games
21st-century Brazilian women